Dos locos en el aire is a 1976 Argentine film, directed by Palito Ortega.

Cast
Alphabetically, by last name:
 Carlos Balá
 Alberto Bello
 Roberto Carnaghi
 Coco Fossati
 Raúl Fraire
 Katunga
 Ángel Magaña
 Palito Ortega
 Evangelina Salazar
 Julia Sandoval

External links
 

1976 films
Argentine musical comedy films
1970s Spanish-language films
1970s Argentine films